Balaciu is a commune located in Ialomița County, Muntenia, Romania. It is composed of four villages: Balaciu, Copuzu, Crăsanii de Jos and Crăsanii de Sus. It also included Sărățeni village until 2005, when it was split off to form Sărățeni Commune.

References

Communes in Ialomița County
Localities in Muntenia